Anna Nielsen (born 23 April 1998) is a Danish sports shooter. She competed in the women's 10 metre air rifle event at the 2020 Summer Olympics.

References

External links
 

1998 births
Living people
Danish female sport shooters
Olympic shooters of Denmark
Shooters at the 2020 Summer Olympics
Place of birth missing (living people)
21st-century Danish women